Tomasz Walczak (born 17 August 2005) is a Polish professional footballer who plays as a forward for Wisła Płock.

References

External links

2005 births
Living people
Polish footballers
Association football forwards
Poland youth international footballers
Wisła Płock players
Ekstraklasa players
Sportspeople from Płock